This is a family tree for the kings of Scotland, since the unification under the House of Alpin in 834, to the personal union with England in 1603  under James VI of Scotland. It includes also the Houses of Dunkeld, Balliol, Bruce, and Stewart.

See also: List of Scottish monarchs - Scotland - History of Scotland - List of British monarchs - Family tree of the British royal family - Family tree of British monarchs

Houses of Alpin and Moray

Houses of Dunkeld, Sverre, Balliol and Bruce 

Note: This chart also includes the kings from the Houses of Sverre (Margaret); Balliol (John I); and Bruce (Robert I, David II)

House of Stewart

Notes

References

.
Monarchs family tree
Dynasty genealogy
monarchs family tree